Ángela Gabriela Tenorio Micolta (born 27 January 1996 in Lago Agrio, Sucumbíos) is an Ecuadorian athlete specialising in the sprinting events. She won two medals at the 2014 World Junior Championships. Earlier she competed at the 2013 World Championships in the 100 metres without qualifying for the semifinals. In addition, she has won multiple medals on regional level.

Competition record

Personal bests
Outdoor
100 metres – 10.99 (+0.9 m/s) (Toronto 2015)
200 metres – 22.84 (-0.5 m/s) (Cuenca 2015)
400 metres – 54.28 (Ibarra 2014)

References

External links

 
 
 

1996 births
Living people
Ecuadorian female sprinters
World Athletics Championships athletes for Ecuador
Pan American Games silver medalists for Ecuador
Pan American Games medalists in athletics (track and field)
Athletes (track and field) at the 2015 Pan American Games
Athletes (track and field) at the 2019 Pan American Games
Athletes (track and field) at the 2016 Summer Olympics
Olympic athletes of Ecuador
South American Games silver medalists for Ecuador
South American Games medalists in athletics
Competitors at the 2014 South American Games
Athletes (track and field) at the 2018 South American Games
IAAF Continental Cup winners
Medalists at the 2015 Pan American Games
Athletes (track and field) at the 2020 Summer Olympics
Olympic female sprinters
21st-century Ecuadorian women